Rolla Downtown Airport  is a  privately owned, public use airport located three nautical miles (6 km) southwest of the central business district of Rolla, a city in Phelps County, Missouri, United States.

Facilities and aircraft 
Rolla Downtown Airport covers an area of 33 acres (13 ha) at an elevation of 987 feet (301 m) above mean sea level. It has one runway designated 9/27 with an asphalt surface measuring 3,028 by 38 feet (923 x 12 m).

For the 12-month period ending December 31, 2011, the airport had 285 general aviation aircraft operations, an average of 23 per month. At that time there were two single-engine aircraft based at this airport.

See also 
 Rolla National Airport (FAA: VIH), located at

References

External links 

 Rolla Downtown (K07) at Missouri DOT Airport Directory
 Aerial image as of February 1995 from USGS The National Map
 

Airports in Missouri
Buildings and structures in Phelps County, Missouri